West Liberty, Ohio is a village in Logan County, Ohio, United States.

West Liberty, Ohio may also refer to:
West Liberty, Crawford County, Ohio, an unincorporated community
West Liberty, Morrow County, Ohio, an unincorporated community
a former name of Poasttown, Ohio, an unincorporated community in Butler County

See also
Liberty, Ohio, an unincorporated community in Montgomery County
East Liberty, Ohio, an unincorporated community in Logan County